This is a list of people executed in New Jersey.  No one has been executed by the state of New Jersey since 1963, although a statute reinstating capital punishment for murder had been in force from 1982 until 2007. New Jersey executed a total of 361 people from its inception to the abolition of the death penalty on December 17, 2007. The first person executed was a slave known to history only as Tom for a rape in 1690. The last execution was of Ralph Hudson for murder on January 22, 1963. Of those executions, 187 occurred in the 20th century. The last execution for a crime other than murder (or conspiracy to murder) was of Andrew Clark in 1872 for rape. The last woman executed was Margaret Meierhoffer in 1881.

Except for a dozen slaves executed by burning in the early 18th century, executions in New Jersey were by hanging until 1906.  Electrocution was used since then, with the exception of the execution of Frederick Lang in the Middlesex County jail by hanging in 1909. Hangings in New Jersey were carried out under the authority of the county in which the condemned man or woman was convicted; after the switch to the electric chair, all executions took place under state authority in the execution chamber of the Trenton State Prison, where death row and the electric chair resided. In 1982, New Jersey resumed executions after the nationwide moratorium imposed by Furman v. Georgia; a year later, the state transitioned to lethal injection as their method of execution. However, they never ended up executing any inmates by that method. To this date, Ralph Hudson's 1963 electrocution is the last execution in New Jersey's state history.

In 2006, New Jersey lawmakers drafted a moratorium on executions while a task force studied the fairness and cost of the death sentence. New Jersey had eight people on Death Row at the time. On December 10, 2007, the New Jersey Senate passed bill to repeal the current death penalty statute, and replaced it with life imprisonment without parole. On Dec. 13, 2007, the state's General Assembly adopted the same law. Governor Corzine signed the bill into law on  December 17, 2007. All eight of New Jersey's death row inmates (including Jesse Timmendequas, whose rape and murder of a seven-year-old girl in 1994 led to the creation of laws requiring community notification of registered sex offenders) had their sentences commuted to life without parole.

Executions in New Jersey, 1900-1963 

A complete list of 15,269 executions in the United States prior to the reintroduction of capital punishment in the 1970s was compiled by M. Watt Espy and John Ortiz Smykla, and was made available through the Inter-University Consortium for Political and Social Research.

See also 
 Capital punishment in New Jersey
 Capital punishment in the United States

References 

New Jersey law
 
Lists of people executed in the United States
New Jersey-related lists